Narottam Lal Joshi (16 December, 1914 – 3 December, 1994) was an Indian politician who served as the first Speaker of the Rajasthan Legislative Assembly from 31 March 1952 to 25 April 1957 in the Congress MLA of Jhunjhunu.

Being associated with the national ideology for many years, Joshi participated in the Indian independence movement and played an active role in the Prajamandal movements against feudal exploitation. After India's independence, in the first general election held in India in 1952, Joshi became a member of the Legislative Assembly and was elected as the first Speaker of the first Rajasthan Legislative Assembly on 31 March 1952.

References

20th-century Indian politicians
1914 births
1994 deaths
People from Jhunjhunu district